According to inscription on the stele of Sdok Kok Thom, Indrapura or Amarendrapura was the first capital of Jayavarman II reign about 781, before the foundation of Khmer Empire in 802.

Location 
George Coedes and Claude Jacques identified it with Banteay Prei Nokor, near Kompong Cham, Cambodia, while Michael Vickery assumes it was closer to Kompong Thom. Some scholars have proposed Ak Yum as the center of Amarendrapura.

Footnotes

References

Archaeological sites in Cambodia
Former populated places in Cambodia
1st millennium in Cambodia